The events listed below are both anticipated and scheduled for the year 2023 in Pakistan.

Incumbents

Federal government

Provincial government

State government

Services chief

Events

January 
 2 January – New Zealand tour to Pakistan
 3 January – 
 Two intelligence officers, including the director of the provincial counterterrorism department, are shot dead outside a restaurant in Khanewal, Punjab, by suspected Pakistani Taliban gunmen.
 The government orders the closure of all shopping malls and retail markets by 8:30 p.m. (PKT) daily as part of an energy conservation plan to offset increasing energy prices.
5 January – Pakistan was shaken by a 5.8-magnitude earthquake, according to the National Seismic Monitoring Center, and the tremors were felt in Gilgit, Jhelum, Chakwal, Pakpattan, Lakki Marwat, Nowshera, Malakand, Azad Kashmir, and other areas of the country.
9 January – The Government of Pakistan and the United Nations co-hosted one-day International Conference on Climate Resilient Pakistan in Geneva, Switzerland to aid Pakistani people after the devastating floods in 2022. Under the presidency of Shehbaz Sharif, the Prime Minister of Pakistan, and Antonio Guterres, the Secretary-General of the United Nations, Pakistan raised more than $10 billion for recovery and rehabilitation process in flood effecting areas.
9/10 January – Death of Yahya
13 January – Sarband police station attack in Peshawar, Khyber Pakhtunkhwa.
14 January – Pervaiz Elahi, the Chief Minister of Punjab had dissolved the 17th Provincial Assembly of the Punjab.
15 January – Polling for the second phase of Sindh local government elections were held in the 16 districts of Karachi and Hyderabad.
18 January – Mehmood Khan, the Chief Minister of Khyber Pakhtunkhwa had dissolved the 11th Provincial Assembly of Khyber Pakhtunkhwa.
19 January – Three police officers are killed in a suicide bombing at a police outpost in Khyber Pakhtunkhwa.
20 January – A bomb blast derails a passenger train in Peshi village, Kachhi District, Balochistan, injuring eight people.
23 January – A major power outage in Pakistan leaves nearly 220 million people without electricity after a failure at the national power grid. Earlier this month, Shehbaz Sharif had ordered a reduction of energy consumption as the country faces a severe energy crisis. 
27 January – It is announced that at least 18 people have been killed in the past two weeks by toxic chemicals from factories in Karachi, Sindh. 
29 January –
2023 Lasbela bus crash: At least 41 people are killed and two others are injured when a bus plunges off a bridge and bursts into flames in Lasbela District, Balochistan. 
Tanda Dam boat disaster: Fifty one people are killed when their boat capsizes in Tanda Dam, Kohat District, Khyber Pakhtunkhwa.
30 January – 2023 Peshawar mosque bombing: At least 100+ people are killed and 170 others are injured when a Jamaat-ul-Ahrar suicide bomber detonates his explosive vest in a mosque in Peshawar.

February 
 3 February – At least seventeen people are killed when a bus and a truck crash in a head-on collision in Kohat District, Khyber Pakhtunkhwa.
 6 February – Pakistani Prime Minister Shehbaz Sharif orders the ban on Wikipedia to be lifted, three days after the website was banned for alleged anti-Muslim and blasphemous content.
 10 February – Two people are killed and three others are injured when a roadside bomb hits a vehicle in Kohlu District, Balochistan.
 13 February – 2023 Pakistan Super League
 13 February – Lynching of Waris: Police in Punjab, arrest 50 men for the lynching of a blasphemy suspect at a police station in Nankana Sahib District two days ago.
 14 February – Three Pakistani Taliban members are killed by fellow militants who were trying to free them while being transported from Miranshah to Bannu, Pakistan by counter-terrorism officers. Four of the attackers are also killed in the ensuing shootout.
 20 February – 2023 Kallar Kahar bus accident: Fourteen people are killed and 63 others are injured when a bus crashes and overturns near Kallar Kahar, Chakwal District, Punjab.
 20 February – 2023 Barkhan incident
 22 February – Jail Bharo Tehreek
 25 February – Thirteen people are killed and several others are injured when a bus collides with a van in Rahim Yar Khan, Punjab.
 26 February – Four people are killed and 14 others are injured in a bombing at a market in Barkhan, Balochistan.

March 
 3 March – Harnai coal mine explosion
 6 March – At least nine police officers are killed and 16 other people are injured in Sibi, Pakistan, when a suicide bomber riding on a bike strikes a police vehicle.

Predicted and scheduled

March 
 16 March - 2023 Pakistan by-elections

April 
 13 April – New Zealand tour to Pakistan

July 
 7 July – 2023 Shandur Polo Festival

August 
 13 August – Kashmir Premier League (Pakistan)

September 
 2 September  – 2023 Asia Cup

Unknown dates 
 2023 Karachi local government elections
 2023 Islamabad local government elections
 2023 Pakistani general election
 Asma Jahangir Conference
 International Urdu Conference

Arts

Cinema

Deaths

January-March 
5 February - Pervez Musharraf, former president and army chief.
13 February - Zia Mohyeddin, television actor and director.
26 February - Shahida Raza, field hockey and football player.

See also

Country overviews
 Pakistan
 Economy of Pakistan
 Government of Pakistan
 History of Pakistan
 History of modern Pakistan
 Outline of Pakistan
 Politics of Pakistan
 Terrorist incidents in Pakistan in 2023
 Years in Pakistan

Related timelines for current period
 2023
 2023 in politics and government
 2020s
 21st century

References 

 
Pakistan
Pakistan
2020s in Pakistan
Years of the 21st century in Pakistan